Sann Myint (born 24 March 1952) is a Burmese weightlifter. He competed in the men's middle heavyweight event at the 1980 Summer Olympics.

References

1952 births
Living people
Burmese male weightlifters
Olympic weightlifters of Myanmar
Weightlifters at the 1980 Summer Olympics
Place of birth missing (living people)
Asian Games medalists in weightlifting
Weightlifters at the 1978 Asian Games
Asian Games bronze medalists for Myanmar
Medalists at the 1978 Asian Games
20th-century Burmese people
21st-century Burmese people